Philematium is a genus of beetles in the family Cerambycidae.

Species
 Philematium astoboricum  
 Philematium calcaratum  
 Philematium chromalizoides 
 Philematium currori  
 Philematium debile  
 Philematium femorale  
 Philematium festivum  
 Philematium ghesquierei  
 Philematium greeffi  
 Philematium mussardi  
 Philematium rugosum  
 Philematium swahili  
 Philematium virens

References

Callichromatini